Buffalo Center–Rake–Lakota Community School District was a school district serving Buffalo Center, Lakota, and Rake, Iowa.

It was established on July 1, 1992, by the merger of the Buffalo Center–Rake Community School District and the Lakota Community School District. The predecessor districts had already established a grade-sharing relationship between one another, as well as the Thompson Community School District and the Titonka Community School District. The relationship continued with the single successor district, Thompson, and Titonka, with the agreement to last for three years. In November 1994 the residents of the Buffalo Center–Rake–Lakota school district and the Thompson school district voted on whether they should consolidate into a single district; the Titonka district community did not attempt to join the merger. The residents of the Thompson district voted down that merger. Instead the Buffalo Center–Rake–Lakota and Thompson districts continued grade-sharing for the 1995–96 school year. The Titonka district changed its grade-sharing partner to the Woden–Crystal Lake Community School District. In November 1995 the second merger referendum for Buffalo Center–Rake–Lakota and Thompson occurred; this one succeeded. On July 1, 1996, it finally merged with Thompson, to become the North Iowa Community School District.

References

Notes

Defunct school districts in Iowa
Education in Kossuth County, Iowa
Education in Winnebago County, Iowa
1992 establishments in Iowa
School districts established in 1992
1996 disestablishments in the United States
Educational institutions disestablished in 1996